Naushahro Feroze District is a district in the province of  Sindh,  Pakistan. Its capital is Naushahro Feroze city. The Naushahro Feroze was given the status of District on 15 November 1989 and. Before, it was Taluka of Nawabshah District (Now Shaheed Benazirabad). On given status as district, Naushahro Feroze was placed under administrative control of Sukkur Division however, it has been placed under Shaheed Benazirabad Division during 2011.

Government and politics

National Assembly representation 
District Naushahro Feroze has two members in National Assembly of Pakistan. The district electoral is referred to as NA-212 and NA-212. The member elected from NA-212 represents the constituencies of Moro and Naushahro Feroze Talukas. The member elected from NA-212 represents Kandiaro, Bhirya and Mehrabpur Talukas.

Provincial Assembly representation 
The district has five member representation in Provincial Assembly of Sindh. The provincial assembly electoral for the district is as below:
 PS-35 (Naushahro Feroze city, Mithiani, Abran, Bhorti)
 PS-34 (Tharushah, Bhirya, Darbelo)
 PS-33 (Halani, Kandiaro, Mehrabpur)
decreased one seat in census 2017
 PS-36 (Moro, New Jatoi, Dars)

Local governments (tehsils of district)
Moro
Naushahro Feroze
Bhiria
Kandiaro
Mehrabpur

Transportation
The main N-5 passes through the district.

The main railway track passes through the district which is not functional for a long time. The route was from Padidan to NF, Moro, Dadu, etc. but it has ended now. Now the main major railway station for the NF peoples is Padidan which is fully functional and having second longest platform in Pakistan with a vast locoshed area. Have major trains stop, Hazara Express, Awami Express, Fareed Express, Pakistan Express and Sukkur Express.

Demographics
At the time of the 2017 census, Naushahro Feroze district had a population of 1,612,047, of which 831,392 were males and 780,446 females. The rural population was 1,232,814 (76.48%) and urban 379,233 (23.52%). The literacy rate is 53.83%: 66.22% for males and 40.73% for females.

The majority religion is Islam, with 98.30% of the population. Hinduism (including those from Scheduled Castes) is practiced by 1.64% of the population.

At the time of the 2017 census, 89.45% of the population spoke Sindhi, 4.68% Urdu and 3.34% Punjabi as their first language.

List of Dehs
The following is a list of Naushahro Feroze District's Dehs, organised by Tehsils:

 Naushahro Feroze Tehsil (58 Dehs)
 Wagan,
 Agham
 Arban
 Batil
 Bhanbhri
 Bhurnd
 Bookar
 Chanari
 Changal
 Cheeho
 Dall
 Danheja
 Dhori Bachal
 Gejh No. 1
 Gejh No. 2
 Ghanghro
 Izzat Waggan
 Jarri
 Jiskani
 Kajhar
 Kalooro
 Kalro
 Kanghal
 Keti Abu Bakar No. 1
 Keti Abu Bakar No. 2
 Khariro
 Khuhawar No. 1
 Khuhawar No. 2
 Khuhi Jalal
 Koor Gahno
 Koor Hassan
 Loothi
 Masur Ji Wai
 Menghlo
 Miranpur
 Mithiani No. 1
 Mithiani No. 2
 Mubejani
 Nathar Detha
 Naushahro
 Noor Pur
 Paddidan
 Panjo
 Parya
 Phull
 Pir Parto
 Sahib Khan
 Seengarchi
 Serhal
 Sher Khan
 Shuja Muhammad
 Tetri
 Thatt No. 1
 Thatt No. 2
 Veesar
 Wagan
 Wassan
 Wassayo
 Moro Tehsil (53 Dehs)
 Abad Kahkot
 Belo Khero Dero
 Belo Lalia
 Bet Budho
 Bhambhro Dero
 Borarai
 Chando
 Chaneja
 Dalchand
 Daris
 Deparja
 Dheeran Jagir
 Dilo Shah
 Doro Behan
 Dumber Ji Wai
 Fareed Dero
 Fato Balal
 Fazil Jagir
 Ganghan Jagir
 Ghairabad Kahkot
 Gharho
 Junalo
 Kacho Koheri
 Kalhora
 Karap
 Kareja
 Karocho
 Kenchi Jagir
 Khair Wah
 Khaliso
 Khero Dero
 Khokhar
 Korai
 Kot Satabo
 Lalia
 Lett
 Lundki
 Malkani
 Manaheen
 Mari
 Miran Jatoi
 Misri
 Moro
 New Gachero
 Old Gachero
 Qaim Koor
 Sadhuja
 Saleh Pur
 Sehra
 Sultan Beghan
 Wad Pagia
 Waryaso Jagir
 Waryaso Rayati
 Mehrabpur Tehsil (34 Union councils)
 Bago Daro
 Behlani
 Bhorgi
 Chibhar Babhan
 Deengaro
 Dehat
 Dewan
 Dodha
 Godho Hindu
 Halani
 Hote Khan Jalbani
 Kotri Kabeer
 Langarji
 Mad Ibyani
 Mehar Haji
 Mehrabpur
 Moule Dino Haji
 Natho Rajper
 Nau-Abad
 Peer Waito
 Punjaban
 Qaisar Mari
 Rajo Dahri
 Saeed Pur
 Saleh Sahito
 Sangi
 Sittar Dino Mangrio
 Syed Shuja
 Tuttah
 Vighia Mal
 Kandiaro Tehsil (52 Dehs)
 Abad-111
 Bahri-1
 Bahri-2
 Bazidpur
 Beelo Kamaldero
 Bello Mohbatdero
 Dello Sumita
 Belo Bhounar
 Bhagodero-1
 Bhagodero-2
 Bhority
 Budak
 Chachak
 Dabhro
 Darbelo new
 Darbelo old
 Detha
 Ghanghra
 Ghulam Shah
 Gul Shah
 Haji Shah
 Jea Pota
 Kalatagar-1
 Kalatagar-2
 Kamaldero-1
 Kamaldero-2
 Kandhar
 Kandiaro
 Khairodero
 Khanwahan
 Kouro Khushik
 Ladho Bisharat
 Lakha
 Larik
 Lundi
 Machi
 Mahessar
 Manjuth
 Mirzapur
 Mohbatdero Jagir
 Mohbatdero Siyal
 Moria
 Mosodero
 Pirmard
 Sahita
 Salehpur
 Samita
 Sethar
 Shah Mirdero
 Shanikhani
 Sona Bindi
 Thatt Moosa
 Bhiria Tehsil (32 Dehs)
 Baran
 Bella Wah
 Bhiria
 Bhiro
 Burira
 Chaheen Manomal
 Chakar Wah
 Dali
 Dalipota
 Dheengaro
 Dingaro
 Gher Gujo
 Jalbani
 Kajar
 Kandir
 Khah Jagir
 Khahi Mamon
 Khahi Qasim
 Khahi Rahu
 Kot Bahadur
 Ladho Rano
 Machur
 Madd Aleem
 Mango
 Molhan Jagir
 Molhan Rayati
 Palano
 Panhwari
 Pano Usman
 Rajo Keerio
 Soondhan
 Tharushah

References

Bibliography

External links

Bahria Foundation College Naushahro Feroze
Provincial Assembly of Sindh

 
Districts of Sindh